Papyrus 125, designated by  (in the Gregory-Aland numbering of New Testament manuscripts), is an early copy of the New Testament in Greek. It is a papyrus manuscript of the First Epistle of Peter. Using the study of comparative writing styles (palaeography), the manuscripts has been dated by the INTF to the 3rd or 4th century.

Description 
Only pieces from one leaf of the codex have survived to the present day. The papyrus is in a fragmentary condition, having extant only 1 Peter 1:23-25; 2:1-4. The text is written in one column per page, 30 lines per page.
The Greek text of this codex is probably a representative of the Alexandrian text-type. It was published by Dirk Obbink in 2009.

Location 
The manuscript is currently housed in the Papyrology Rooms of the Sackler Library at Oxford with the shelf number P. Oxy. 4934.

See also 
 List of New Testament papyri
 Oxyrhynchus Papyri
 Biblical manuscript

References

Further reading

External links

General Info
 Leuven Database of Ancient Books Entry

Images 
 P.Oxy.LXXII 4934 from Papyrology at Oxford's "POxy: Oxyrhynchus Online".

Official registration 
 "Continuation of the Manuscript List" Institute for New Testament Textual Research, University of Münster. Retrieved September 9, 2009

New Testament papyri
4th-century biblical manuscripts
First Epistle of Peter papyri